Kalateh-ye Abuzar (also Romanized as Kalāteh-ye Abūz̄ar; also known as Kalāteh-ye Shāhīn) is a village in Binalud Rural District, in the Central District of Nishapur County, Razavi Khorasan Province, Iran. At the 2006 census, its population was 39, in 9 families.

References 

Populated places in Nishapur County